The  Presbyterian Hospital Invitational Criterium, or Charlotte Criterium, is an annual criterium bicycle race along an  course located in Uptown, Charlotte, North Carolina, United States. With the inaugural race occurring in 2004, this was known as the Bank of America Criterium through the 2006 race, when the name and sponsorship was changed to its current name for the 2007 event. Its $125,000 purse is the largest for this type of event in the United States. The race serves as a benefit for the Brain Tumor Fund of the Carolinas, and is an officially sanctioned race as part of the USA CRITS Tour.


Men's winners
The men's criterium runs along a course along Tryon Street between 2nd and 7th Streets throughout Uptown Charlotte.

Women's winners

References

External links
 Presbyterian Hospital Invitational Criterium official website

Cycle races in the United States
Recurring sporting events established in 2004
2004 establishments in North Carolina
Sports competitions in Charlotte, North Carolina
Road bicycle races